Niederkorn is a town in the commune of Differdange, in south-western Luxembourg, on the Chiers river, from which it takes its name. As of March 31, 2020, the town has a population of 7,272.

Niederkorn is home to FC Progrès Niederkorn, a football team in Luxembourg's National Division.

A new hospital, the "Hôpital Princesse Marie-Astrid", built between January 2003 and June 2007, is located in Niederkorn .

The #1 TICE bus connects Niederkorn with Differdange, Belvaux and Esch-sur-Alzette.

Niederkorn is connected to Luxembourg City via a train line that stops in Berchem, Bettembourg, Noertzange, Schifflange, Esch-sur-Alzette, Belval Université, Belval Redange, Belvaux Soleuvre, Obercorn, and Differdange, before arriving in either Athus or Rodange. 

Students attending Miami University Dolibois European Center are housed with families in Niederkorn, as it is a 10-minute bus ride from the chateau.

Niederkorn is the birthplace of Tessy Antony, ex-wife of Prince Louis of Luxembourg.

References

External links

Differdange
Towns in Luxembourg